Bolivia has competed at every edition of the Pan American Games since the fifth edition of the multi-sport event in 1967. The first Bolivian medal was a silver in the 1991 taekwondo tournament. Since then the country has won one gold medal, three silver medals, and eight bronze medals between 2003 and 2019. Aside from two silver medals in taekwondo and tennis, and a bronze in cycling, all the other medals came from racquetball. As of the last Pan American Games in 2019, Bolivia is twenty-eighth on the all time medals list. Bolivia competed in the first ever Pan American Winter Games in 1990, however it failed to medal.

The country won its first ever gold medal in 2019, and also had its best performance with a total of five medals won.

Medal count 

To sort the tables by host city, total medal count, or any other column, click on the  icon next to the column title.

Summer

Winter

Medals by sport

References